Óscar Luis Celada (born 9 March 1966), known simply as Óscar, is a Spanish former professional footballer who played as a midfielder.

He amassed La Liga totals of 189 matches and 11 goals over nine seasons, mainly with Sporting de Gijón (six years).

Club career
Born in Luarca, Asturias, Óscar arrived at local club Sporting de Gijón in 1985 but had to wait three years for his first opportunities with the main squad. His best year came in the 1993–94 season, as he started in all his 26 appearances (21 complete games) while the club retained its La Liga status.

Óscar signed with Real Zaragoza in 1994, helping the Aragonese to that campaign's UEFA Cup Winners' Cup – he did not leave the bench in the final– but he was mainly a fringe player during his three-year spell.

In his final four years, Óscar played two seasons apiece with UD Las Palmas and Universidad de Las Palmas CF, retiring in June 2001 at 35. After obtaining his degree in medicine, he returned to Zaragoza in 2008 as chief doctor. The following year, in the same capacity, he joined the Spain national team.

In July 2017, still as part of the medical department and three years after cutting ties with Zaragoza, Celada was appointed at Atlético Madrid.

References

External links

1966 births
Living people
People from Valdés, Asturias
Spanish footballers
Footballers from Asturias
Association football midfielders
La Liga players
Segunda División players
Segunda División B players
Tercera División players
Sporting de Gijón B players
Sporting de Gijón players
UP Langreo footballers
Real Zaragoza players
UD Las Palmas players
Universidad de Las Palmas CF footballers
Spanish sports physicians